The World Colored Heavyweight Championship was a title awarded to black boxers in the late nineteenth and early twentieth centuries. This was the only recognized heavyweight championship available to black boxers prior to Jack Johnson winning the world heavyweight title in 1908. The title continued to exist until the reign of Joe Louis as universally recognized champ, as the color bar against black heavyweights was enforced during and for a generation after Jack Johnson's reign as world champ.

Drawing the color line
Though not sanctioned by any governing body, the colored heavyweight title was publicly recognized due to the color bar in pro boxing in the 19th and early 20th centuries, when white champions drew the color line and would not defend the title against a black man. In the heavyweight division, the color bar was adamantly defended by "The Boston Strong Boy", bare-knuckle boxing champ John L. Sullivan, the first modern heavyweight champ, who had fought black fighters on his way up to the title but would not defend it against a black man. 

Succeeding white heavyweight champs James Corbett and James J. Jeffries followed the same pattern. Since the white champs had fought black fighters as equals on their way up, the color bar undeniably was maintained due to racial prejudice. Since black boxers were being denied a shot at the world title solely due to their race, the general public gave credence to the colored heavyweight title.

Maintaining the color bar
The color bar remained in force even after colored heavyweight title holder Jack Johnson won the world's heavyweight title in 1908, thus ensuring the colored title remained the ultimate prize for all other black boxers. 

Once he was the world's heavyweight champ, Johnson (who relinquished the colored title) never fought black opponents, either. He denied matches to black heavyweights Joe Jeanette (his successor as colored heavyweight champ) and Sam Langford (who beat Jeanette for the colored title) and the young Harry Wills (who was colored heavyweight champ during the last year of Johnson's reign as world's heavyweight champ). Blacks were not given a shot at the title allegedly because such top boxing promoters as Tex Rickard believed that a fight between two black boxers would not draw at the gate.

Johnson, Jeanette & Langford
Jack Johnson fought Joe Jeanette a total of seven times, all during his reign as colored champ before he became the world's heavyweight champion, winning four times and drawing twice (three of the victories and one draw were newspaper decisions). In their first match on 1905, they had fought to a draw, but in their second match on 25 November 1905, Johnson lost as he was disqualified in the second round of a scheduled six-round fight. Johnson continued to claim the title because of the disqualification. 

After Johnson became the first African-American Heavyweight Champion of the World on December 26, 1908, his World Colored Heavyweight Championship was vacated. Jeanette fought Sam McVey for the title in Paris on February 20, 1909, and was beaten, but later took the title from McVey in a 49-round bout on April 17 of that year in Paris for a purse of $6,000. Sam Langford subsequently claimed the title during Jeanette's reign after Johnson refused to defend the World Heavyweight Championship against him. Eighteen months later, Jeanrette lost the title to Langford.

Johnson never again fought Jeanette despite numerous challenges and avoided Langford, whom he had fought once while he was the colored champ and beaten him very severely on points in a 15-rounder. In August 1914, as Johnson neared the end of his troubled reign, there were reports that Johnson had agreed to fight Langford for the world heavyweight title in Paris, but nothing came of it.

After losing his world heavyweight championship, Johnson never again fought for the colored heavyweight crown.

Because great boxers of the era were barred from fighting for the heavyweight championship because of racism, Johnson’s refusal to fight African-Americans offended the African-American community, since the opportunity to fight top white boxers was rare. Jeanette criticized Johnson, saying, "Jack forgot about his old friends after he became champion and drew the color line against his own people."

Proposed World Boxing Council title
The World Boxing Council attempted to create a similar championship in 2004 called the All African World Championship, which would be open to boxers of African descent from any country as well as boxers of any race living in Africa. This proposal was met with worldwide criticism, and the World Boxing Council ultimately abandoned the idea.

List of champions 
Eighteen men were recognized as World Colored Heavyweight Champion, combining for 28 total reigns.

See also
World Colored Light Heavyweight Championship
World Colored Middleweight Championship
World Colored Welterweight Championship
Black Heavyweight Championship
World White Heavyweight Championship

References

Defunct boxing titles
Black culture